Brian Roper Archer (21 August 1929 – 10 March 2013) was an Australian Senator who represented the Liberal Party for the state of Tasmania.

Archer was born in Calder, Tasmania. His older brother was state upper house politician Dick Archer. Archer worked as a real estate consultant and farmer before being elected to parliament at the 1975 election, and served as a Senator from 13 December 1975 until his resignation on 31 January 1994.

When John Howard became Leader of the Opposition in September 1985, Archer was appointed Shadow Special Minister of State and Spokesman on Science. He held those positions until August 1987.

He died on 10 March 2013, aged 83.

References

External links

1929 births
2013 deaths
Liberal Party of Australia members of the Parliament of Australia
Members of the Australian Senate
Members of the Australian Senate for Tasmania
20th-century Australian politicians